Robert Gerald "Bob" Kabel (November 11, 1934 – November 12, 2016) was a Canadian ice hockey forward who played 48 games in the National Hockey League with New York Rangers during the 1959–60 and 1960–61 seasons. The rest of his career, which lasted from 1955 to 1970, was spent in various minor leagues

Career statistics

Regular season and playoffs

Awards and achievements
Calder Cup (AHL) Championships (1961 & 1962)
Honoured Member of the Manitoba Hockey Hall of Fame

References

External links
 
 Bob Kabel's biography at Manitoba Hockey Hall of Fame

1934 births
2016 deaths
Baltimore Clippers players
Canadian ice hockey centres
Flin Flon Bombers players
Ice hockey people from Manitoba
New York Rangers players
Phoenix Roadrunners (WHL) players
Providence Reds players
St. Paul Rangers players
Salt Lake Golden Eagles (WHL) players
San Francisco Seals (ice hockey) players
Saskatoon Quakers players
Saskatoon Regals/St. Paul Saints players
Sportspeople from Dauphin, Manitoba
Springfield Indians players
Trois-Rivières Lions (1955–1960) players
Vancouver Canucks (WHL) players